Cedar Cliff, a house at 501 N. 9th St. in Garden City, Kansas, was built in 1909.  It was listed on the National Register of Historic Places in 1997.  It has also been known as the Edward G. Finnup House.

It is a "majestic" three-story Dutch Colonial Revival-style house with a center hall plan.

See also
Little Finnup House, also NRHP-listed in Garden City

References

External links

Houses on the National Register of Historic Places in Kansas
Colonial Revival architecture in Kansas
Dutch Colonial Revival architecture
Buildings and structures completed in 1909
Finney County, Kansas